Acacia seclusa, commonly known as saw range wattle, is a small tree belonging to the genus Acacia and the subgenus Juliflorae that is endemic to northern Australia.

Description
The canopy has a spreading habit that is silvery to bluish in colour. The hard, grey bark is shallowly rimose. Like most species of Acacia it has phyllodes rather than true leaves. The coriaceous and sericeous phyllodes are grey-green; in colour and have many longitudinal nerves that are close together and three main longitudinal nerves. It blooms from August producing yellow flowers. The simple inflorescences occur singly or in pairs in the axils or are racemose. Following flowering seed pods form that have a narrowly oblong shape and can be constricted between the seeds.

Distribution
It is native to a small area in the eastern Kimberley region of Western Australia where it is mostly found in riparian areas. The restricted range is among the Saw Range close to Dillon Springs in the steep rocky slopes around the spring.

See also
List of Acacia species

References

seclusa
Acacias of Western Australia
Plants described in 2003